John Neschling is a Brazilian orchestral and operatic conductor. He was the musical director and the chief conductor of the Orquestra Sinfônica do Estado de São Paulo (São Paulo State Symphony) from 1997 to 2008.

He was the Artistic Director of the Municipal Theatre of São Paulo from January 2013 until September 2016, and has been a member of the Brazilian Academy of Music since 2003.

Early career
He studied conducting under Hans Swarowsky and Reinhold Schmid in Vienna and under Leonard Bernstein and Seiji Ozawa in Tanglewood. Later, he won several international conducting competitions.

European positions
Neschling has been music director of Teatro Nacional de São Carlos in Lisbon, Sankt Gallen Theater in Switzerland, Teatro Massimo in Palermo and the Bordeaux Opera, and assistant conductor at the Vienna Opera. He has also been invited conductor at the London Symphony, Accademia Nazionale di Santa Cecilia in Rome, Tonhalle Orchestra in Zurich, and the BBC Symphony Orchestra in London.

He came back to Brazil in 1973 to assume the position of music director of the municipal theaters of São Paulo and Rio de Janeiro.

São Paulo State Symphony
During the twelve years under his leadership, the OSESP became a first rate international orchestra, and recorded a series of CDs with Brazilian and international music, winning 5 
Diapason d'Or and one Latin Grammy. He also organized tournées that took the orchestra to play at several concert halls around the world, including the Avery Fisher Hall in New York City and at the Musikverein in Vienna.

Under his request, the great hall of the old Júlio Prestes train station was renovated and turned into Sala São Paulo, the home of OSESP and one of the best concert halls in the world. It opened in 1999.

Municipal Theater of the City of São Paulo

In 2013 Neschling was appointed as the artistic director of Theatro Municipal de São Paulo, where he served until September 2016, when he was dismissed under accusations of fiscal misconduct.

References
 Neschling, J. "Música Mundana", Rocco 2009, 192pp  
 https://web.archive.org/web/20110719113217/http://www.wdk-koeln.de/kuenstler.php?Kuenstler_ID=129
 http://g1.globo.com/sao-paulo/noticia/2016/09/john-neschling-e-afastado-da-direcao-artistica-do-theatro-municipal-de-sp.html

Notes

Further reading 
 Bigler-Marschall, Ingrid: John Neschling, in: Kotte, Andreas (Hg.): Theaterlexikon der Schweiz, Chronos Verlag Zürich 2005, Band 2, S. 1316–1317. (in German, French, Italian and Romansh. Includes bibliographical references.) ; LCCN 2007423414; OCLC 62309181.

External links 

 Orquestra Sinfônica do Estado de São Paulo (OSESP)

Brazilian conductors (music)
Brazilian Jews
Living people
Musicians from Rio de Janeiro (city)
Brazilian people of Austrian-Jewish descent
21st-century conductors (music)
Year of birth missing (living people)